Talking Rock Creek (also known as Devils Race Track) is a stream in the northwestern Georgia, United States, that is a tributary of the Coosawattee River (flowing into the Reregulation Reservoir).

Talking Rock is an English translation of the native Cherokee language name.

See also

 List of rivers of Georgia (U.S. state)

References

Rivers of Gilmer County, Georgia
Rivers of Gordon County, Georgia
Rivers of Murray County, Georgia
Rivers of Pickens County, Georgia
Rivers of Georgia (U.S. state)